Tausche is a surname. Notable people with the surname include:

 Anton Tausche (1838–1898), Czech teacher and politician
 Gerhard Tausche (born 1957), German archivist and author
 Kayla Tausche (born c. 1986), American broadcast journalist

See also 
 Tausch (disambiguation)
 Tauche
 Tauschia
 Tauscha
 Tauscher (disambiguation)
 Tauscheria (disambiguation)

German-language surnames